Oncideres senilis is a species of beetle in the family Cerambycidae. It was described by Henry Walter Bates in 1885. It is known from Nicaragua and Mexico.

References

senilis
Beetles described in 1885